Chen Xuan (born 10 February 1978) is a Chinese former synchronized swimmer who competed in the 1996 Summer Olympics.

She is the older sister of swimmer Chen Yanyan.

References

1978 births
Living people
Chinese synchronized swimmers
Olympic synchronized swimmers of China
Synchronized swimmers at the 1996 Summer Olympics
Sportspeople from Changsha
Synchronized swimmers from Hunan